Solenopsidini (meaning "pipe-faced") is a tribe of myrmicine ants with about 20 genera.

Genera

Adelomyrmex 
Anillomyrma 
Austromorium 
Baracidris 
Bariamyrma 
Bondroitia 
Cryptomyrmex 
Dolopomyrmex 
Epelysidris 
Kempfidris 
Machomyrma 
Megalomyrmex 
Monomorium 
Myrmicaria 
Oxyepoecus 
Rogeria 
Solenopsis 
Stegomyrmex 
Syllophopsis 
Tropidomyrmex 
Tyrannomyrmex

References

Myrmicinae
Ant tribes
Taxa named by Auguste Forel